Matt Brucker (born April 27, 2004) is an American soccer player who plays as a forward for High Point Panthers.

Career

Youth
Brucker played with the Germantown Legends organization for seven years, winning four consecutive state championships while playing in the Olympic Development Program and National League.

On June 4, 2021, Brucker signed with USL Championship side Memphis 901 on an academy contract, allowing him to remain eligible to play college soccer. He made his debut the following day, appearing as an injury-time substitute during a 2–1 win over Indy Eleven.

In the fall of 2022, Brucker attended High Point University to play college soccer.

References

External links
 Profile at Memphis 901

2004 births
Living people
American soccer players
Association football forwards
High Point Panthers men's soccer players
Memphis 901 FC players
People from Collierville, Tennessee
Soccer players from Tennessee
USL Championship players